Maria Alexandru (née Golopența) (born 30 December 1939 in Plugova) is a former Romanian table tennis player.

Table tennis career
From 1957 to 1980 she won several medals in singles, doubles, and team events in the Table Tennis European Championships and in the World Table Tennis Championships.

Between 1953 and 1979, she played in 12 World Championships, winning three gold medals in the doubles competition.

During her active career she played for Progresul Bucharest. She also won eleven English Open titles including six in the singles.

See also
 List of table tennis players
 List of World Table Tennis Championships medalists

References

1939 births
Living people
People from Caraș-Severin County
Romanian female table tennis players